Jacob Miller is an American baseball pitcher in the Miami Marlins organization.

Amateur career
Miller lives in Baltimore, Ohio, and attended Liberty Union High School. He committed to play college baseball at Louisville as a freshman in high school. As a junior, Miller went 9–1 with 143 strikeouts and a 0.70 ERA in 60 innings pitched. He was named the Ohio Gatorade Player of the Year in his senior season after going 9–1 with 133 strikeouts in 57 innings pitched. He was also named the All-Metro Player of the Year by the Columbus Dispatch. Miller also played basketball and ran track at Liberty Union. He was rated the best prospect for the Major League Baseball (MLB) draft in the state of Ohio.

Professional career
Miller was selected by the Miami Marlins with the 46th overall pick of the 2022 MLB draft. He signed with the team and received a $1,679,900 signing bonus.

Personal life
Miller's parents are Jim and Danna.

References

External links

Living people
Baseball players from Ohio
People from Baltimore, Ohio
2003 births